Todhills is a small village on the outskirts of Carlisle, Cumbria, England. The village's name is from Old English tota-hyll "look-out hill".
Located north of Carlisle, nestled between the border city and Gretna, Todhills is so small that it really is known as a hamlet and not a village. Amongst the houses there is a pub, a post box and a telephone box.

References

Villages in Cumbria
Rockcliffe, Cumbria